On 11 March 1942, during World War II, General Douglas MacArthur and members of his family and staff left the Philippine island of Corregidor and his forces, which were surrounded by the Japanese. They traveled in PT boats through stormy seas patrolled by Japanese warships and reached Mindanao two days later. From there, MacArthur and his party flew to Australia in a pair of Boeing B-17 Flying Fortresses, ultimately arriving in Melbourne by train on 21 March. In Australia, he made a speech in which he declared, "I came through and I shall return".

MacArthur was a well-known and experienced officer with a distinguished record in World War I, who had retired from the United States Army in 1937 and had become a defense advisor to the Philippine government. He was recalled to active duty with the United States Army in July 1941, a few months before the outbreak of the Pacific War between the United States and the Empire of Japan, to become commander of United States Army Forces in the Far East (USAFFE), uniting the Philippine and United States Armies under one command.

By March 1942, the Japanese invasion of the Philippines had compelled MacArthur to withdraw his forces on Luzon to Bataan, while his headquarters and his family moved to Corregidor. The doomed defense of Bataan captured the imagination of the American public. At a time when the news from all fronts was uniformly bad, MacArthur became a living symbol of Allied resistance to the Japanese.

Fearing that Corregidor would soon fall, and MacArthur would be taken prisoner, President Franklin D. Roosevelt ordered MacArthur to go to Australia. A submarine was made available, but MacArthur elected to break through the Japanese blockade in PT boats under the command of Lieutenant (junior grade) John D. Bulkeley. The staff MacArthur brought with him became known as the "Bataan Gang". They would become the nucleus of his General Headquarters (GHQ) Southwest Pacific Area (SWPA).

Background 
Douglas MacArthur was a well-known and experienced officer. The son of Lieutenant General Arthur MacArthur Jr., who was awarded the Medal of Honor for his services in the American Civil War, MacArthur graduated at the top of the United States Military Academy class of 1903. He was an aide-de-camp to his father from 1905 to 1906, and to President Theodore Roosevelt from 1906 to 1907. During World War I he commanded the 84th Brigade of the 42nd (Rainbow) Division in the fighting on the Western Front. After the war he served as Superintendent of the United States Military Academy, and as Chief of Staff of the United States Army. He retired from the United States Army in 1937, and became a field marshal in the Philippine Army.

MacArthur's job was to advise the Philippine government on defense matters, and prepare the Philippine defense forces when the Philippines became fully independent, which was to be in 1946. The Philippine Army, almost entirely manned and officered by Filipinos with only a small number of American advisors, was raised by conscription, with two classes of 20,000 men being trained each year, starting in 1937. In addition, there was a regular U.S. Army garrison of about 10,000, half of whom were Filipinos serving in the U.S. Army known as Philippine Scouts. When MacArthur was recalled from retirement in July 1941 to become commander of United States Army Forces in the Far East (USAFFE) at the age of 61, he united the Philippine and United States Armies under one command.

In getting the Philippine Army ready for war, MacArthur faced an enormous task. On a visit to the United States in 1937, MacArthur lobbied the Navy Department for the development of PT boats—small, fast boats armed with torpedoes—for which he believed that the geography of the Philippines, with its shallow waters and many coves, was ideally suited. The nascent Philippine Navy acquired three, known as "Q" boats, after President Manuel L. Quezon. In August 1941, the U.S. Navy created Motor Torpedo Boat Squadron Three, under the command of Lieutenant (junior grade) John D. Bulkeley. It was a half-strength squadron, with only six PT boats instead of the normal twelve, numbered 31 to 35 and 41. It arrived at Manila in September 1941. It was understood that a fleet consisting of more than PT boats would be required for a successful defense of the Philippines.

As early as 1907, U.S. naval and military planners had concluded that it would be impractical to repel an invasion of the Philippines. The best that could be hoped for was that the garrison could hold out on the Bataan peninsula until help arrived. In the 1920s it was estimated that they could do so for about 60 days. By the 1930s, the planners had become decidedly pessimistic in view of the increased capability of aircraft, and by 1936 they were agreed that the Philippines should be written off. But in July 1941, this decision was abruptly reversed, and it became the policy of the U.S. government to defend and hold the Philippines. This was based, at least in part, in the belief that Boeing B-17 Flying Fortress bombers could deter or defeat an invading force.

Soon after the Japanese invasion of the Philippines in 1941, MacArthur, in accordance with the pre-war plan, declared Manila an open city, and ordered his forces on Luzon to withdraw to Bataan. The Philippine government, the high commissioner's office and MacArthur's USAFFE headquarters moved to Corregidor Island. Although the dependents of U.S. military personnel had been sent back to the United States, MacArthur was, until his recall from retirement, a Philippine government employee, so his family had remained in the Philippines. MacArthur's wife, Jean MacArthur, and young son, Arthur MacArthur IV, went with him to Corregidor. Arthur celebrated his fourth birthday on Corregidor, on 21 February 1942. When an aide asked about Arthur's possible fate, MacArthur replied: "He is a soldier's son."

Most of the United States Asiatic Fleet retired to the south of the Philippines. The loss of Manila and the U.S. Naval Base Subic Bay meant that fuel and spare parts became scarce. The PT boats relied on Canopus and the floating dry dock  for assistance with maintenance. Despite this, Motor Torpedo Boat Squadron Three continued to patrol. On 17 December,  and  rescued 296 survivors from SS Corregidor, which had been carrying refugees to Australia when it struck a mine and sank in Manila Bay. A week later,  ran aground while patrolling south of Manila Bay, and was set on fire to prevent her being salvaged by the Japanese.  met a similar fate a month later, after its engines failed and it drifted onto a reef. The PT boats attacked enemy barges off Luzon on the night of 23 January 1942, a small Japanese warship on 1 February, and a small vessel, probably a fishing trawler, on 17 February.

Decision

Washington 

In a message to President Franklin D. Roosevelt in Washington, D.C., on 11 February, MacArthur announced that he and his family intended to "share the fate of the garrison". This meant surrender at best; MacArthur knew that death from artillery fire or an air raid was also likely. Three days later, the Chief of Staff of the United States Army, George C. Marshall, urged MacArthur to send his family away, but MacArthur ignored this part of the message. Singapore, once considered impregnable, fell on 15 February, and in Washington, the possibility that Corregidor would also fall and MacArthur would be taken prisoner was considered. MacArthur was America's most experienced general, but would be of little use in a prisoner of war camp. Moreover, he had become a living symbol of Allied resistance to the Japanese. The brave but doomed defense of Bataan had captured the imagination of the American public, who saw MacArthur as the only Allied general who knew how to fight the Japanese. Walter R. Borneman noted that:

Secretary of State Cordell Hull raised the possibility of MacArthur's evacuation. Brigadier General Dwight Eisenhower wrote in his diary:

Roosevelt considered sending MacArthur to Mindanao to coordinate the defense of the Philippines from there, but another consideration arose. The fall of Singapore sealed the fate of the American-British-Dutch-Australian Command (ABDA), of which MacArthur's command was nominally a part. Discussions were held with the British about future command arrangements. A broad agreement was reached that the United States would assume responsibility for the Southwest Pacific. A senior American officer was required, and MacArthur was the obvious choice. On 23 February, MacArthur received a message that had been drafted by Roosevelt, Secretary of War Henry L. Stimson and Marshall. It read:

Corregidor 

MacArthur responded with a request that he might select the time of his departure. "Unless the right moment is chosen for this delicate operation", he wrote, "a sudden collapse might occur." "With regard to the actual movement", he went on, "I deem it advisable to go to Mindanao by combined use of surface craft and submarine, and thence by air, further movement by submarine being too time consuming." Marshall replied that Roosevelt would allow him to choose the time and method of his departure. ABDA was dissolved on 27 February, and MacArthur nominally came under Dutch command, but was ordered to continue communicating directly with the War Department.

MacArthur inspected the PT boat squadron on 1 March. With air cover provided by his four remaining Curtiss P-40 Warhawks, MacArthur and his wife Jean took a half-hour ride on PT-41. Although the sea was tranquil, Jean still felt queasy. Ostensibly, the purpose of MacArthur's visit was presenting Bulkeley with the Distinguished Service Cross for sinking an "unidentified 5,000-ton enemy ship with torpedoes without serious damage to his ship or casualty to his crew", but afterwards MacArthur took Bulkeley aside and asked him if it would be possible to make the  journey through uncharted waters at night in PT boats. Bulkeley told him that it would be "a piece of cake."

When some days passed without any further word on the matter, follow-up messages were sent on 6 and 9 March. By 10 March, MacArthur had decided that the Bataan front was not in danger of imminent collapse, and replied that he planned to depart on 15 March, when the submarine  was scheduled to arrive at Corregidor. Radio broadcasts in the United States calling for MacArthur to be placed in charge in Australia had been picked up by MacArthur's headquarters in Corregidor, and it had to be assumed that the Japanese had heard them too. There were ominous signs: Japanese surface patrols had been stepped up in the Subic Bay area, and there were reports of Japanese destroyers heading north from the southern Philippines. MacArthur therefore elected not to wait for the Permit, but to leave as soon as possible, by PT boat on the night of 11 March. Major General Jonathan M. Wainwright was left in command on Bataan and Corregidor. "When I get back", MacArthur told him, "if you're still on Bataan, I'll make you a lieutenant general." Wainwright replied: "I'll be on Bataan if I'm still alive."

Of the decision to depart by PT boat rather than wait for the submarine, Lieutenant Robert B. Kelly, executive officer of Motor Torpedo Boat Squadron Three, and commander of PT-34, later recalled:

Escape

Preparations 

Bulkeley and his crews overhauled the PT boats for the voyage. All of the engines had performed hard war service, and had been operated for double the recommended mileage without overhaul. As a result, they were reduced to operating at half speed. Since there were no replacement parts, the gaskets, which normally would have been discarded, had to be carefully cleaned and replaced. Each PT boat would carry twenty 55-gallon drums of additional fuel on the deck. To make room for the passengers, Bulkeley had to leave 32 of his men behind, who would be sent to fight as infantry on Bataan.

Sutherland, who was MacArthur's chief of staff, drew up the passenger lists. Rockwell and his chief of staff, Captain Herbert J. Ray, were ordered to accompany MacArthur. They were already under orders to return by submarine, but this was switched to accompanying MacArthur when his date of departure was brought forward. A United States Army Air Corps officer, Brigadier General Harold H. George, was included at the request of the United States Army Air Forces.

MacArthur was accompanied by his family: his wife Jean, four-year-old son Arthur, and Arthur's Cantonese amah, Ah Cheu. MacArthur later defended his decision to take her instead of an American nurse. "Few people outside the Orient", he wrote, "know how completely a member of the family an amah can become, and Ah Cheu had been with us since Arthur's birth. Because of her relationship to my family, her death would have been certain had she been left behind."

In case a doctor was needed, Major Charles H. Morhouse was summoned from Bataan to accompany the party. The remaining thirteen were members of MacArthur's staff, who were loyal and experienced; some had been with MacArthur for years. Creating a new staff in Australia would have taken time, while taking his existing one would enable him to commence work soon after arrival in Australia. They would be more valuable there than in the Philippines, where they would have been taken prisoner. Sutherland included two of his own men: his assistant, Lieutenant Colonel Francis H. Wilson, and his stenographer, Master Sergeant Paul P. Rogers. Promoted from private that day, Rogers was the only enlisted man on the list, which he typed. A number of men gave him letters to post.

Because there was no food for the passengers on the PT boats, Jean and MacArthur's aide-de-camp, Lieutenant Colonel Sidney L. Huff, packed tins of food into four duffel bags, one for each boat. Huff removed the four-star rank number plates from MacArthur's car so they could be used in Australia, and took a mattress for the MacArthurs to lie on. Stories later circulated that it was full of cash or gold. Other stories had it that furniture from MacArthur's residence in the Manila Hotel had been loaded on board the PT boats, even, in one version of the story, the piano. In fact, each passenger was limited to one piece of luggage weighing  or less. Jean took a small suitcase with some clothes. It sported a label from the Hotel New Grand in Yokohama, where she stayed during her honeymoon. Ah Cheu wrapped her possessions in a handkerchief. MacArthur took nothing.

PT boat voyage 

Only PT-41, which carried MacArthur and his family, departed from Corregidor's North Dock. The passengers of the remaining boats were taken to Bataan in launches and boarded their PT boats there. While his family boarded, MacArthur spoke to Major General George F. Moore, the commander of the Harbor Defenses of Manila and Subic Bays. "George", he told him, "keep the flag flying. I'm coming back."

PT-41 departed at 19:45 on 11 March and joined the other three 15 minutes later. A navy minelayer led the PT boats through the protective minefield in single file. The boats then assumed a diamond formation, with PT-41 in the lead and PT-34 bringing up the rear. If attacked by the Japanese, PT-41 was to flee while the other three boats engaged the enemy. The seas were moderate, but most of the passengers quickly became seasick. MacArthur later recalled:

During the night, the four boats became separated. Bulkeley spent time looking for the other three boats, but was unable to find them in the darkness. At dawn he gave up, and headed for one of the alternative hiding places. Kelly's PT-34 was the first to reach the rendezvous point, a cove on Tagauayan Island, two hours late at 09:30. There was no sign of the other boats, and Rockwell, in the same boat with Kelly, was far from convinced that Kelly had found the correct island. Some repairs were made, and the boat was refueled by hand pumps from the drums. Two men were posted atop the island's tallest hill to watch out for the Japanese and the other boats.

PT-32, which had only two good engines, had straggled behind the others. Around dawn, Schumacher spotted what appeared to be a Japanese destroyer heading towards him. He jettisoned his fuel drums so he could increase speed and run from it. He ordered his crew to man the .50-caliber machine guns and get ready to launch torpedoes. Akin prepared to toss a barracks bag filled with code books overboard. However, as the light improved, and the vessel drew closer, another look through the binoculars revealed that it was not a Japanese destroyer at all, but PT-41, carrying an angry Bulkeley. Schumacher was ordered to recover the drums he had jettisoned, but this proved to be a time-consuming task, and a dangerous one in broad daylight, and it had to be abandoned after only a few drums were recovered. Bulkeley had his gunners sink the rest. The two boats then hid for the day in a nearby cove.

In the afternoon, PT-41 and PT-32 made their way to Tagauayan, where they found PT-34. There was a discussion about whether to proceed to Mindanao, or wait for Permit. Bulkeley warned that the seas might even be higher. But, since there was no assurance that the submarine would make it, MacArthur decided to continue, departing in daylight at 18:00 so as to be sure to meet their air transport there. Since PT-32 had no fuel to make Mindanao, its passengers were divided between PT-41 and PT-34. Soon after they had departed, PT-35 belatedly arrived at the rendezvous point. Akers found the crew of PT-32 there, and discovered that the other two boats had been and gone. He therefore set out for Cagayan de Oro as well.

At 19:00, about an hour after they had left Tagauayan, PT-34 and PT-41 spotted a Japanese cruiser. Whether because of the high waves, the glare of the sun, or simple inattentiveness, the cruiser did not spot them. After midnight, the weather began to worsen, with heavy swells and sporadic squalls. Kelly later recalled:

By dawn, the winds and swells had subsided, but the delay caused by the bad weather had slowed the two boats, and they now had to travel across the Mindanao Sea in daylight. Cagayan was sighted shortly after 06:30 on 13 March. Although PT-34 had led all the way from Tagauayan, Kelly now let Bulkeley take the lead, as he had the channel charts. PT-41 therefore pulled up at the wharf first, with MacArthur on the bow. They were met by Colonel William Morse, an officer on the staff of the Brigadier General William F. Sharp, the commander of U.S. forces on Mindanao. MacArthur told Bulkeley "I'm giving every officer and man here the Silver Star for gallantry. You've taken me out of the jaws of death, and I won't forget it."

A few hours later, PT-35 reached Cagayan. Willoughby later recalled:

USS Permit, under the command of Lieutenant Wreford G. Chapple, reached Tagauayan on 13 March, and found PT-32. With two of his three engines out of action, Schumacher felt that his boat was no longer seaworthy. He had Chapple destroy the boat with Permit deck gun. Chapple then took the fifteen PT-32 crewmen back to Corregidor. There, eight of the crew were disembarked, while Chapple embarked forty more passengers, thirty-six of them codebreakers. Nonetheless, Chapple was ordered to conduct a regular war patrol, which he did. He finally reached Australia on 7 April. Unaware of this, Bulkeley attempted to locate PT-32. Over the next few days he flew over the area as a passenger in various aircraft, including a P-35 and a P-40, in the hope of finding it.

Aircraft 

The commander of U.S. Army Forces in Australia, Lieutenant General George H. Brett, received a radiogram from General Marshall in Washington, D.C., alerting him that MacArthur would be requesting bombers to transport his party from Mindanao to Australia. A subsequent message from MacArthur requested his "most experienced pilots, and the best available planes in top condition", but the only long-range aircraft that Brett had were Boeing B-17 Flying Fortresses of the 19th Bombardment Group which had seen hard service in the Philippines and the Dutch East Indies campaigns. He therefore approached Vice Admiral Herbert F. Leary, the commander of naval forces in the Anzac Area, to ask for a loan of some of twelve newly arrived Navy B-17s. Leary, who had a reputation for refusing requests unless he could see how the Navy would benefit, turned Brett down.

Brett therefore sent four of the 19th Bombardment Group's old planes. Two were forced to turn back with engine trouble. One of the others accidentally dumped  of its fuel. The pilot flew on, and nearly made it to Del Monte Field, but, just a few miles from his destination, the fuel tanks ran dry and the engines stopped. The B-17 crash landed in the sea. Two of the crew were killed, but the rest made it to shore, and thence to Del Monte Field. Only one B-17, piloted by Lieutenant Harl Pease, reached Del Monte, and this B-17 was in poor condition, with no brakes and a faulty supercharger. Sharp ordered it back to Australia before MacArthur arrived. Despite the lack of brakes, Pease made the return trip, carrying sixteen passengers.

Thus, with the arrival of PT-35, all of MacArthur's group had reached Mindanao safely, but there were no aircraft at Del Monte Field to meet them. They were taken to the Del Monte Plantation, where they were lodged in the guest houses, and had breakfast in the clubhouse. MacArthur sent a couple of sharp messages to Brett in Melbourne and Marshall in Washington. On their second day there, a Filipino woman arrived who wanted to speak to MacArthur. Her son was fighting on Luzon, and she had walked  in the hope that the general would have some news about him.

Brett went back to Leary, expecting to be turned down again, but this time, Leary gave Brett the aircraft he wanted. "Perhaps", Brett speculated, "Leary had heard from Washington". The newly formed 40th Reconnaissance Squadron manned the bombers. One B-17 turned back, but two made it to Del Monte Field on 16 March, landing in the dark on a runway lit by flares. Lieutenant Frank P. Bostrom, the pilot of the first plane, calculated that everyone could be carried in just two planes if they left most of their baggage behind. They divided into two groups and the two bombers took off at 01:30 on 17 March. MacArthur rode in the radio operator's seat, which did not need to be manned as the aircraft were travelling under radio silence. For most of the passengers, the trip was dark and cold, with only a blanket between them and the metal skin of the aircraft.

As the two planes approached Darwin, word was received that a Japanese air raid was in progress there. The two B-17s therefore flew on to Batchelor Airfield, where they touched down at 09:30. MacArthur awarded Silver Stars to the crews of the two bombers. Brett's chief of staff, Brigadier General Ralph Royce, was on hand to greet them, and Brett had sent two Australian National Airways DC-3s to bring them to Melbourne. Sutherland had received word of an incoming Japanese air raid, and asked Morhouse to intervene. Morhouse told MacArthur that Arthur, who had suffered badly from seasickness and airsickness, was on an intravenous feed, and could not guarantee that he would survive the trip across the desert. MacArthur then agreed to take the planes to Alice Springs. Sutherland had Huff hurry everyone onto the aircraft, which took off as the air raid siren sounded.

At Alice Springs, the party split up. MacArthur, his family, Sutherland, Morhouse and Huff took a special train that Brett had borrowed from the Australians, while the rest of the staff flew down to Melbourne via Adelaide in the DC-3s. His speech, in which he said, "I came through and I shall return", was first made at Terowie railway station  in South Australia, on 20 March, where he changed trains. On 21 March, MacArthur's journey was completed when his train rolled into Melbourne's Spencer Street station, where he was greeted by the Australian Minister for the Army, Frank Forde.

Aftermath 

Roosevelt issued a public statement on 17 March:

On Bataan, the reaction to MacArthur's escape was mixed, with many American and Filipino troops feeling bitter and betrayed. When Wainwright broke the news to his generals "they were all at first depressed by the news... But I soon saw that they understood just as I understood." Some people with family members in the Philippines were dismayed. One wrote to Roosevelt that "Nothing you could have done would have broken their morale and that of their parents at home so thoroughly". Wainwright held out on Corregidor until 6 May. To Joseph Goebbels, MacArthur was a "fleeing general", while Benito Mussolini labeled him a coward. Marshall decided that the best way to counter this was to award MacArthur the Medal of Honor.

The PT boats scored a hit on the cruiser, but the torpedo was a dud, and failed to explode. No damage resulted. With the loss of Cebu City, there were no more torpedoes, so the active careers of the remaining boats of Bulkeley's squadron came to an end. MacArthur gave PT boat officers a high priority to be flown out from Mindanao. Bulkeley was flown out on MacArthur's orders on 13 April. Knox, Kelly and Akers were evacuated on 23 April, and Brantingham also made one of the last flights out from Mindanao. Sharp surrendered on Mindanao on 10 May.

MacArthur subsequently nominated Bulkeley for the Medal of Honor. The Commander in Chief, U.S. Fleet, Admiral Ernest King was not going to let MacArthur award the Medal of Honor to a naval officer, so he wrote a citation for Bulkeley on behalf of the Navy. Roosevelt presented it to Bulkeley in a ceremony in the Oval Office on 4 August 1942. Bulkeley contributed to a book about his PT squadron's exploits, entitled They Were Expendable. Parts were serialized in Reader's Digest and Life magazines and it became a bestseller in 1942. In 1944, it was adapted as a movie of the same name, with Robert Montgomery playing a character based on Bulkeley, John Wayne one based on Kelly, and Donna Reed in the role of an Army nurse with whom Kelly had a brief liaison. Postwar analysis found that most of the book's claims were exaggerated.

The staff that MacArthur brought with him from Corregidor formed the nucleus of General Headquarters (GHQ) Southwest Pacific Area (SWPA). The "Bataan Gang", as they came to be called, remained with MacArthur for the duration, and were noted for their fanatical loyalty to him. So too was Bulkeley, who lauded MacArthur as "the greatest general as well as statesman since George Washington", and hailed his decision to escape on PT boats as a stroke of genius. Brigadier General Harold H. George, who had escaped with MacArthur from Corregidor, was killed on duty in April 1942 at Batchelor Field, southeast of Darwin, when a USAAF P-40 lost control on takeoff and slammed into George and his party who had just landed in a Lockheed C-40 to inspect the airfields of northern Australia on behalf of MacArthur. George and two others died in the accident. MacArthur eventually kept his promise, and returned to the Philippines. The Bataan Gang returned to Corregidor in March 1945 on four PT boats.

Notes

References

Further reading

1942 in the Philippines
Escape from the Philippines
March 1942 events
Military history of the Philippines during World War II
PT boats
Voyages